Iced tea is a cold tea drink.

Iced tea may also refer to:
IcedTea, a Java-related build and integration project

See also
Icet (disambiguation)
International Consultation on English Texts (ICET)
Ice-T (born 1958), rapper
Ice-T VI: Return of the Real, a 1996 album by Ice-T
ICE T, high speed German train
Aechmea 'Ice-T', a cultivar (plant type)
ISTEA, Intermodal Surface Transportation Efficiency Act
Long Island Iced Tea, a type of alcoholic mixed drink typically made with tequila, vodka, light rum, triple sec, gin, and a splash of cola, which gives the drink the same amber hue as its namesake